Actinocyclus is a genus of sea slugs, dorid nudibranchs, shell-less marine gastropod molluscs in the family Actinocyclidae, and was first described by Christian Gottfried Ehrenberg in 1831.

Species 
Species in the genus Actinocyclus include:
 Actinocyclus papillatus  (Bergh, 1878)
 Actinocyclus verrucosus  Ehrenberg, 1831

See also
 Actinocyclus Ehrenberg, 1837, a genus of diatoms in the family Hemidiscaceae.

References

External links 
 

Actinocyclidae
Gastropod genera
Taxa named by Christian Gottfried Ehrenberg